In Johan Galtung's 1969 paper, "Violence, Peace and Peace Research," he presents his theory of the Conflict Triangle, a framework used in the study of peace and conflict, with the purpose of defining the three key elements of violence that form this "triangle." The theory is based on the principle that peace must be defined by widely accepted social goals, and that any state of peace is characterized by the absence of violence. When a conflict has features of all three areas of violence, the result is a more consolidated, static state of violence in a social system, which may include a conflict or a nation-state, whereas the absence of these three typologies of violence results in peace.

Structural Violence 
Structural Violence, also referred to as social injustice, is defined as injustice and inequality built into the structure of society, resulting in unequal power and, subsequently, imbalanced life chances. There is no requirement for a clear actor to be defined as committing the violence, rather it is embedded within the institutions of the society, where the power to decide the distribution of resources is uneven. Rather than conveying a physical image, structural violence is an avoidable impairment of fundamental human needs. Structural violence is increased in situations where low income individuals also suffer in the rank dimensions of education, health, and power. This is due to an overall consolidation of factors in the social structure, resulting in a high correlation between social class and disempowerment. Structural violence can be recognized through its relative stability, having been built into the social structure. This can make structural violence difficult to ascertain, despite its often vast consequences. This concept has been applied in a large number of cases, some of the most notable are listed below.

Akhil Gupta argued in 2012 that structural violence has been the key influence in the nature and distribution of extreme suffering in India, driven by the Indian state in its alleged corruption, overly bureaucratic standards of governance used to exclude the middle and working classes from the political system through a system of politicized poverty.

Jacklyn Cock's 1989 paper in the Review of African Political Economy applied Galtung's theory of structural violence, analysing the role of militarized society under the apartheid regime of South Africa in the development of patriarchal values that is a form of structural violence against women. Cock found that tacit misdirection of women in society by its leadership focused their energies toward the direct and indirect incorporation of the patriarchal regime in order to maintain the status quo.

Mats Utas claimed that even those youth in Liberia indirectly unaffected by direct violence in the civil war of 1989-1996 suffered from structural violence in the form of association with different blocs, leading to poverty, joblessness and marginalisation effects.

Cultural Violence 
Cultural violence is defined as any aspect of a culture that can be used to legitimise violence in its direct or structural form. Unlike direct and structural violence, then, cultural violence is a foundational principle for extended conflict. The existence of prevailing or prominent social norms make direct and structural violence seem natural or at least acceptable, and serves to explain how prominent beliefs can become so embedded in a given culture that they function as absolute and inevitable and are reproduced uncritically across generations. Galtung expanded on the concept of cultural violence in a 1990 paper also published in the Journal of Peace Research. This concept has been applied in a limited number of cases, with most occurring after Galtung's follow up paper in 1990, some of the most notable of which are listed below.

In Ed Husain's 2007 book The Islamist, seminal extremist literature such as Sayyid Qutb's Milestones is highlighted  as being particularly influential on many young Muslims in terms of defining their identity and life goals, in which the book embodies the principles outlined whereby there is a cultural imperative for violence built into the societal values or cultural values of Islam through such extremist literature.

Gregory Phillips argues in his 2003 book, Addictions and Healing in Aboriginal Country, that resistance to the Western medical sphere driven by previous atrocities committed against the Aboriginal community has led to a fierce resistance effort against modern medicine, addiction treatment and perhaps fuels a desire to seek out drugs and illicit substances as a starting point of addiction. Wide scale suspicion against medical practitioners and government representatives has become engendered in the Aboriginal community.

In Enduring Violence: Ladina Women's Lives in Guatemala, the 2011 book by Cecilia Menjívar, it is argued that the preexisting cultural conditions of mediania, or half and half, agriculture led to women facing large scale cultural violence due to high rents, low returns and high required investment with additionally harsh conditions due to the conflict in Guatemala. Given the patriarchal culture of Guatemala, any earnings would go to the partner of the working woman, leaving a large poverty gap enshrined in the demographic diversity of the country.

Direct Violence 
Direct Violence is characterised as having an actor that commits the violence, and is thus able to be traced back to persons as actors. Direct violence shows less stability, given it is subject to the preference sets of individuals, and thus is more easily recognised. Direct violence is the most visible, occurring physically or verbally, and the victim and the offender can be clearly identified. Direct violence is highly interdependent with structural and cultural violence: cultural and structural violence causes direct violence which on the other hand reinforces the former ones. This concept has been applied in a large number of cases, some of which are listed below.

A 2011 paper by the International Center for Research on Women (ICRW) demonstrated the widespread nature of child marriage in South Asia. The ICRW highlighted marriage before the age of 18 as a fundamental human rights violation, one that leads to early childbearing, with significantly higher maternal mortality and morbidity rates as well as higher infant mortality rates amongst women. The paper most directly presented evidence to show that child brides are at heightened risk of violence in the home.

In Matthew Chandler's 2009 paper on so-called "non-violent" techniques utilised by Hezbollah still include forms of Direct Violence, most notably the threat of violence toward Fouad Siniora's allies after his 2008 order to dismantle the Hezbollah telecommunications network in 2008, which led to the freezing of the order. Further, Hezbollah are argued to have used their operation of social services, in lieu of government operations, as a ransom for support as well as rewarding their fighters with guaranteed healthcare and support for their families. Chandler argues this is due to opposition within the group to harming Lebanese civilians, who they view as "their own", or exacerbating conflict through civil war.

In 2005, Steven Wright made the case for Peacekeeping efforts to be regarded as violence due to increasing use of techniques such as pre-interrogation treatment, and the use of non-lethal weapons such as tear gas for crowd dispersal and plastic bullets, which he terms "torture-lite", being increasingly common in peacekeeping manuals across a number of nation-states and supranational organisations.

Reinforcing Factors 
Galtung focuses a section of the paper on the means of direct and structural violence, in particular, developing groups of factors that may be included as types of such forms and methods of maintaining and reinforcing the mechanisms of such violence. In terms of reinforcing factors, Galtung identifies six key areas:

Linear Ranking Order
Systems in which there is an open and complete ranking of actors leaves no doubt as to the actor who is ranked more highly, and is thus a mechanism of structural violence due to the reinforcement of an existing power dynamic.
Acyclical Interaction Pattern
Systems in which all actors are connected via a one-way ‘correct’ path of interaction, where outcomes are structurally dependent on using this system in the intended way of its design. This makes structural systems stable, as change can only be achieved through this consolidated power-seeking and power-retaining system.
Rank-Centrality Correlation
Within the social system, actors that are higher ranked are more central within the system itself, reinforcing their importance to the status quo as well as their incentives to maintain it.
(4)  System Congruence
Social systems are made up of similar components, allowing those who are ranked highly and are successful at mobilising one system shifting from a comparative advantage within one system to an absolute advantage over all systems of desired operation.
Rank Concordance
Actors that are ranked highly within one metric, such as income, are also ranked highly on other metrics such as education and health. This congruence is also present in actors ranked low within these metrics, and serves to limit mobility within the social system.
Interlevel High Rank Coupling
Collaboration amongst the highest ranks results in the system being defined in such a way that benefits the most powerful actors, usually through a sub optimally ranked representative (not the highest ranked actor), which limits allegations of system consolidation by the most powerful.

Beyond Galtung's initial paper and thesis, scholars have applied the Conflict Triangle to a broad array of conflicts, struggles and occupations since 1969, and retroactively.

Criticism 
Johan Galtung's Conflict Triangle and Peace Research paper are widely cited as the foundational pieces of theory within peace and conflict studies. However, they are not without criticism. Galtung uses very broad definitions of violence, conflict and peace, and applies the terms of mean both direct and indirect, negative and positive, and violence in which one cannot distinguish actors or victims, which serves to limit the direct application of the model itself.

Galtung uses a positivist approach, in that he assumes that every rational tenet of the theory can be verified, serving to reject social processes beyond relationships and actions. This approach enforces a paradigm of clear-cut, currently testable propositions as the ‘whole’ of the system, and thus is often deemed reductionist. Galtung also wields an explicit normative orientation in the paper, in which there is a weighting toward evaluative statements that may show bias or simply opinion, or indeed a trend toward the institutions and concepts of peace in the West, which may serve to limit the applicability of the model more widely.

See also 
 Cost of Conflict, a tool which attempts to calculate the price of conflict to the human race
 Democratic peace theory, a theory which posits that democracies are hesitant to engage in armed conflict with other identified democracies
 Critical Race Theory, a critical examination of society and culture, to the intersection of race, law, and power

References 

Peace and conflict studies